Tibor Bitskey (20 September 1929 – 2 February 2015) was a Hungarian television and film actor.

Partial filmography

 Föltámadott a tenger (1953)
 A harag napja (1953)
 Kiskrajcár (1953) - Madaras Jóska falubelije (uncredited)
 Rákóczi hadnagya (1954) - Bornemissza János hadnagy
 Különös ismertetöjel (1955)
 A Glass of Beer (1955) - Kincse Marci
 Yesterday (1959) - Csendes Imre fõhadnagy
 Virrad (1960) - Csendes fõhadnagy
 Rangon alul (1960) - Jóska, a vita egyik oka
 Légy jó mindhalálig (1960) - Gyéres
 Semmelweis (1961) - Diák
 The Brute (1961) - Gál Jani
 Párbeszéd (1963) - Színész
 A köszívü ember fiai (1965) - Baradlay Ödön
 Zoltán Kárpáthy (1966) - Kis Miska
 Egy magyar nábob (1966) - Kis Miska
 Niet inej cesty (1968) - Kossuth
 Stars of Eger (1968) - Mekcsey István
 Szemtöl szembe (1970) - Gyukits Dezsõ
 Szerelmi álmok - Liszt (1970)
 A gyilkos a házban van (1971) - Tímár százados (magyar hang) (voice)
 Love (1971) - Feri
 A szerelem határai (1974) - Dr. Varga
 A néma dosszié (1978) - Kovács ügyvéd
 The Fortress (1979) - Wagner
 The Little Fox (1981) - Storyteller (voice)
 Idö van (1986) - Laci Bodor
 Banánhéjkeringö (1987) - Bregyán alezredes
 Diary for My Lovers (1987)
 Túsztörténet (1989) - Apa
 Diary for My Mother and Father (1990)
 Melodráma (1991) - Pista bá
 Magic Hunter (1994) - Surgeon
 The Conquest (1996) - Elõd vezér
 Sobri, ponyvafilm (2002) - Kopátsy József fõbíró
 Illúziók (2009) - Grandpa (final film role)

Awards

 Kossuth Prize (2000)
 Order of Merit of Hungary (2013)

Bibliography
 Brown, Karl William. Regulating Bodies: Everyday Crime and Popular Resistance in Communist Hungary, 1948-1956. ProQuest, 2007.

External links

1929 births
2015 deaths
Hungarian male film actors
Hungarian male television actors
Male actors from Budapest
20th-century Hungarian male actors
21st-century Hungarian male actors